Rauli Gostowski (born 24 May 1946) is a Finnish chess player, Finnish Chess Championship medalist (1969).

Biography
From the end of 1960s to the begin 1970s, Rauli Gostowski was one of Finland's leading chess players. In Finnish Chess Championships he has won bronze medal in 1969.

Rauli Gostowski played for Finland in the Chess Olympiad:
 In 1970, at second reserve board in the 19th Chess Olympiad in Siegen (+2, =3, -2).

Rauli Gostowski played for Finland in the European Team Chess Championship preliminaries:
 In 1973, at fifth board in the 5th European Team Chess Championship preliminaries (+1, =1, -3).

References

External links

Rauli Gostowski chess games at 365chess.com

1946 births
Living people
Finnish chess players
Chess Olympiad competitors
20th-century chess players